T. S. Ellis III (born 1940), judge of the United States District Court for the Eastern District of Virginia. Judge Ellis may also refer to:

Frank Burton Ellis (1907–1969), judge of the United States District Court for the Eastern District of Louisiana
Powhatan Ellis (1790–1863), judge of the United States District Court for the District of Mississippi
Ronald L. Ellis (born 1950), magistrate judge of the United States District Court for the Southern District of New York
Sara L. Ellis (born 1969), judge of the United States District Court for the Northern District of Illinois

See also
Justice Ellis (disambiguation)